Simien Mountains National Park is the largest national park in Ethiopia. Located in the North Gondar Zone of the Amhara Region, its territory covers the highest parts of the Simien Mountains and includes Ras Dashan, the highest point in Ethiopia.

It is home to a number of endangered species, including the Ethiopian wolf and the walia ibex, a wild goat found nowhere else in the world. The gelada baboon and the caracal, a cat, also occur within the Simien Mountains. More than 50 species of birds inhabit the park, including the impressive bearded vulture, or lammergeier, with its  wingspan.

The park is crossed by an unpaved road which runs from Debarq, where the administrative headquarters of the park is located, east through a number of villages to the  Buahit Pass, where the road turns south to end at Mekane Berhan,  beyond the park boundary.

History
The park was established in 1969, having been set up by Clive Nicol, who wrote about his experiences in From the Roof of Africa (1971).

The Simien region has been inhabited and cultivated for at least 2,000 years. Initially, erosion began to reveal that the clearing began at the gentle slope of the highland valley but later expanded to a steep slope.

The national park was one of the first sites to be made a World Heritage Site by UNESCO, inscribed in 1978 because of its outstanding biodiversity and spectacular landscape. Due to serious population declines of some of its characteristic native species, in 1996 it was added to the List of World Heritage in Danger. With the stabilization of those species' populations, this listing was removed in 2017.

Geography
It is located within the Simien Massif, which rises above the northern highlands of Ethiopia. The highlands were formed by volcanic flood basalts dating from the Paleogene period roughly 30 million years ago. The massif itself is the remnant of a large shield volcano. Over millions of years due to the heavy erosion of the Ethiopian plateau serrated mountain peaks, deep valleys and 1,500 metre high sheer cliffs have been created, creating some of the most spectacular scenery in the world.

The Simien area is rich in perforated basalt, and serves as an ideal catchment basin. Water is conserved by the Mayshasha River,  and the national park from north to south. As a result, national parks are abundant with wildlife and plants.

Wildlife

Flora 
The vegetation is mixed with African alpine forests, wilderness forests and alpine vegetation. High altitude areas include montane savannah and tree heath (Erica arborea), giant lobelia (Lobelia rhynchopetalum), yellow primrose (Primula verticillata), everlastings (Helichrysum spp.), A lady's mantle (alchemilla), and a moss (mosses, Grimmiaceae). Lichen covers the trees of the alpine area. Vegetation throughout the park is divided into three sections, Montane forest (1900-3000m), Ericaceous Belt or SubAfroalpine (2700-3700m) and the Afroalpine (3700-5433m). Within the Montane forest there are Juniper trees (Juniperous procera), African redwood (Hagenia abyssinica), African olive (Olea africana), fig (Ficus spp), and waterberry (Syzygium guineense). There are also many varieties of shrubs including cocona (Solanum sessilistellatum), Abyssinian rose (Rosa abyssinica), cowslip (Primula verticillata), and stinging nettle (Urtica). The ridges and canyons have scattered meadows, forests and bushes. At one time, the St. John's wort (Hypericum spp.) Forests grew from 3,000 m to 3,800 m above sea level, but now it is almost gone. The exact number is not known.

Fauna 

The park is populated with a total of 21 large mammal species live within the park boundaries such as gelada baboon (Theropithecus gelada), Ethiopian wolf (also called Simen fox, Canis simensis), Walia ibex (Capra walie), and 
Menelik's bushbuck (Tragelaphus scriptus meneliki). Inhabits on the slope of the northern slope of the massif are mostly native to the Simien Mountains, and most of them are found in the park. The Ethiopian wolf, Gelada baboon, Menelik's bushbuck, and Walia Ibex are mammals endemic to Ethiopian Highlands. Other rare mammals include Hamadryas baboon, colobus monkey, leopard, caracal, serval, wild cat, spotted hyena, golden jackal, and Anubis baboon. There are also small herbivores that rare within the slopes of simian mountains, such as rock hyrax, common duiker, and klipspringer. 

In an expedition in 2015, 11 species of rodents and two shrew species were recorded, all of which are endemic to the Ethiopian Plateau, and 7 of which have only been observed in the Simien Mountains. These include Arvicanthis abyssinicus and Crocidura baileyi. A possible new species of shrew in the genus Crocidura may also have been identified.

The park provides a home to 400 species of bird species that thrived throughout the mountainous ecoregion, which includes Abyssinian Woodpecker, bearded vulture, Tawny eagle, Rüppell's vulture, Verreaux's eagle, Black-winged Lovebird, Ethiopian Black-headed Oriole, Eurasian kestrel, lanner falcon, augur buzzard and thick-billed raven.

Conservation 
Simien Mountains National Park was established in 1969 and is protected under the National Reserve Act. The management of national parks effectively protects the representative species of parks and works closely with local residents to reduce the pressure on park resources by expanding arable land, overfishing livestock, and overcapacity of natural resources.

Sufficient financial support is needed for park management and livelihood alternative development of local residents. It is necessary to prepare, implement, review and monitor the management plan, to revise and expand the boundary of the park, and to participate fully in the local residents. Local cooperation is particularly important to prevent sustainable use of national park resources and to develop sustainable livelihoods. Adequate financial support for resettlement of inhabitants in the heritage area and the introduction of effective livestock management are essential to reduce the severe stress on wildlife.

In order to maintain excellent universal values, environmental education and training programs of residents living in and out of the heritage are needed as well as obtaining the cooperation and support of local residents in heritage management.

Gallery

See also 
 National parks in Ethiopia
 List of World Heritage Sites in Ethiopia

References

External links 
 Simien Mountains National Park

 UNESCO World Heritage profile of Simien National Park
 Explore Simien National Park in the UNESCO collection on Google Arts and Culture
 United Nations Environment Programme: World Conservation Monitoring Centre: Simien National Park
 The National Parks of Ethiopia: Simien Mountain Adventure - Part I (Addis Tribune)
 The National Parks of Ethiopia: Simien Mountain Adventure - Part II (Addis Tribune)
 The National Parks of Ethiopia: Simien Mountain Adventure - Part III (Addis Tribune)

National parks of Ethiopia
Protected areas of Amhara Region
Simien Mountains
Ethiopian Highlands
World Heritage Sites in Ethiopia
World Heritage Sites in Danger
Protected areas established in 1969
1969 establishments in Ethiopia
Important Bird Areas of Ethiopia
Ethiopian montane moorlands